CVF may refer to:

 Climate Vulnerable Forum
 Carrier Vessel Future, the project name for the 
 Courchevel Airport's IATA code, France
 Cyprus Volleyball Federation
 Competing values framework
 Computer Vision Foundation
 Compressed Volume File, container file for compressed FAT volumes by Microsoft DoubleSpace/DriveSpace
 Complex-valued function, function of a complex variable
 Center for Vigilant Freedom, predecessor to the International Civil Liberties Alliance